= 6/5 =

6/5 may refer to:

- June 5 (month-day date notation)
- May 6 (day-month date notation)
